Hermann Carl Hempel (13 April 1848 – 26 September 1921) was a German landscape painter and illustrator of the Düsseldorf school of painting and director of the Kunsthalle Düsseldorf.

Life 
Born in Stralsund, Hempel studied painting at the Düsseldorf Art Academy. There Andreas Müller was his teacher. He also took lessons with the landscape painter Eugen Dücker. Hempel was a member of the artists' associations Malkasten, Laetitia and Orient. On 13 February 1875, he starred on the Malkasten stage in the farce Das Ständchen. In 1877, he married Adele, the daughter of the Düsseldorf landscape painter . The couple had two children, Friedrich, who became a concert organist, and Klara. From 1883 to 1920 Hempel was director and managing director of the Kunsthalle Düsseldorf. In 1900 and 1902 Hempel stayed in Katwijk.

Hempel died in Düsseldorf at the age of 73.

Work 

 Templates for Bad Pyrmont – Souvenirblatt, coloured wood engravings by Richard Brend'amour, 1881
 Wassermühle
 Teilansicht von Moselkern
 Aprilstimmung
 Eifellandschaft mit Gehöft
 Herbstliche Waldstimmung mit Weitblick
 Impressionistische Landschaft

References

Further reading 
 Hans Vollmer ed, Hempel, H. C. in Allgemeines Lexikon der Bildenden Künstler von der Antike bis zur Gegenwart. Created by Ulrich Thieme and Felix Becker. Vol. 16: Hansen–Heubach. E. A. Seemann, Leipzig 1923, .

External links 

 Hermann Carl Hempel, Datenblatt im Portal rkd.nl (Netherlands Institute for Art History)

19th-century German painters
19th-century German male artists
20th-century German painters
20th-century German male artists
German landscape painters
German illustrators
German curators
1848 births
1921 deaths
People from Stralsund